Ironi Ness Ziona B.C. (or spelled as Ironi Nes Ziona B.C.) is a professional basketball club based in Ness Ziona, Israel. The team plays its home games at the Lev Hamoshava, which has capacity for 1,200 people. The club plays in the Israeli Basketball Premier League, the top tier of Israeli basketball and 2022–23 European North Basketball League. 

In 2021, Nes Ziona won the FIBA Europe Cup, the continental fourth-tier Championship.

History
Ironi Ness Ziona  was founded in 2005. In the 2018–19 season, Ironi Nes Ziona made its debut in a European competition. It played in the qualifying rounds of the 2018–19 FIBA Europe Cup, and played its first match ever on 20 September 2018, defeating the Södertälje Kings 72–67. The team went on to qualify for the regular season, where it played in Group D. The team advanced to the play-offs, where it lost in the first round to the Bakken Bears from Denmark.

In the 2020–21 FIBA Europe Cup, Ironi played its third season in the competition and qualified for the Final Four. It won the trophy, its first in history, after defeating Stal Ostrów Wielkopolski in the final which was hosted in Tel Aviv.

Honors
FIBA Europe Cup
Champions (1): 2020–21

Season by season

Sponsorship names
Due to sponsorship reasons, the club has known several names:
Ironi "Dizengoff Trading" Nes Ziona (2013–2017)
Ironi "Hai Motors" Nes Ziona (2017–present)

Players

Current roster

Notable players

References

External links
Official website 
Team profile at eurobasket.com
Team profile at the Israeli BSL WebSite 

Basketball teams in Israel
Israeli Basketball Premier League teams